Megatominae is a subfamily of the beetle family Dermestidae. This subfamily contains several of the most well-known household and stored-product pest beetles, in the genera Anthrenus and Trogoderma.

Genera
There are about 27 genera.

Genera include:

 Adelaidia Blackburn, 1891
 Amberoderma Háva & Prokop, 2004
 Anthrenocerus Arrow, 1915
 Anthrenus Geoffroy, 1762
 Caccoleptus Sharp, 1902
 Claviella Kalík, 1987
 Cryptorhopalum Guérin-Méneville, 1838
 Ctesias Stephens, 1830
 Globicornis Latreille in Cuvier, 1829
 Hemirhopalum Sharp, 1902
 Hirtomegatoma Pic, 1931
 Labrocerus Sharp in Blackburn & Sharp, 1885
 Megatoma Herbst, 1792
 Miocryptorhopalum Pierce, 1960
 Myrmeanthrenus Armstrong, 1945
 Neoanthrenus Armstrong, 1941
 Orphinus Motschulsky, 1858
 Paratrogoderma Scott, 1926
 Phradonoma Jacquelin du Val, 1859
 Reesa Beal, 1967
Sodaliatoma Háva, 2013
 Thaumaglossa Redtenbacher, 1867
 Trogoderma Dejean, 1821
 Trogoparvus Háva, 2001
 Turcicornis Háva, 2000
 Volvicornis Háva & Kalík, 2004
 Zhantievus Beal, 1992

References

External links
 Wikispecies:Megatominae
 Megatominae at ITIS

Dermestidae
Taxa named by William Elford Leach